This list of phylogenetic tree viewing software is a compilation of software tools and web portals used in visualizing phylogenetic trees.

Online software

Desktop software

1 "All" refers to Microsoft Windows, Apple OSX and Linux; L=Linux, M=Apple Mac, W=Microsoft Windows

Libraries

See also 
List of phylogenetics software
Phylogenetics

References

External links 
A 'comprehensive list' of Tree Editors
List of Tree Editors

 
Genetics databases
Phylog
Phylogenetics
Phylogenetics
Visualization software
Tree of life (biology)